George Patrick Hughes (21 December 1902 – 8 May 1997) was an English tennis player.

Hughes and Fred Perry won the doubles at the French Championships in 1933 and at the Australian Championships in 1934.  Hughes later teamed up with Raymond Tuckey. They won the doubles in Wimbledon in 1936. Hughes reached the semi finals at Roland Garros in 1931, where he beat Vernon Kirby and George Lott before losing to Christian Boussus.   Between 1929 and 1936 Hughes was a member of the British Davis Cup team.

Hughes had been the only British man to reach the singles final at the Italian championships, capturing the title in 1931 and runner-up the following year, until Andy Murray won the tournament in 2016. Hughes captured the doubles title in both those years too, when the tournament, in its infancy, was played in Milan.

He was the editor of the Dunlop Lawn Tennis Annual and Almanack from the late 1940s to the late 1950s.

He worked for years in London as the Vice President of Dunlop Sporting Goods World Wide.

Grand Slam finals

Doubles (3 titles, 4 runner-ups)

References

External links
 
 
 
 National Portrait Gallery – Portrait of George Hughes

1902 births
1997 deaths
Australian Championships (tennis) champions
English male tennis players
French Championships (tennis) champions
Sportspeople from Sutton Coldfield
Wimbledon champions (pre-Open Era)
Grand Slam (tennis) champions in men's doubles
British male tennis players
Tennis people from the West Midlands (county)